History of the Quran is the timeline and origin of the written compilations or manuscripts of the holy book of Islam, based on historical findings. It spans several centuries, and forms an important major part of the early history of Islam.

While there are various proposed etymologies, one is that the word قرآن 'Quran' comes from the Arabic verb قرء 'qaraʾa' 'to read' in the verbal noun pattern فعلان 'fuʿlān', thus resulting in the meaning 'reading'. Others are that it is a name given to the book by God, without any previous etymology, that the word comes from the verb قرن 'qarana' 'to join, to yoke', referring to the gathering together of revelation, and that it comes from قرائن 'qarāʾin', the plural of a word variously translatable as 'evidence', 'yoke', 'union'. Nine out of the ten imams of recitation have it read in their tradition with a hamzah, with only Ibn Kathir's tradition excluding the letter.

According to the traditional Muslim belief and Islamic scholarly accounts, the revelation of the Quran began in 610 AD when the angel Gabriel (believed to have been sent by God) appeared to Muhammad (a trader in the Western Arabian city of Mecca, which had become a sanctuary for pagan deities and an important trading center) in the cave of Hira.,
According to Islamic tradition, the revelations started one night during the month of Ramadan in 610 AD, when Muhammad, at the age of forty, received the first visit from the angel Gabriel,  reciting to him the first verses of Surah Al-Alaq. Muslims believe that Muhammad continued to have revelations until his death in 632 AD.

According to Islamic tradition, the Quran was first compiled into a comprehensive book by Abu Bakr. As the Islamic Empire began to grow, and differing recitations were heard, the rasm - or consonantal skeleton of the Quran - was compiled for uniformity in recitation under the direction of the third caliph, Uthman ibn Affan (r. 644–656 AD). For this reason, the Quran as it exists today is also known as the Uthmanic codex. According to Francis Edward Peters (1991), what was done to the Quran in the process seems to have been extremely conservative and the content was formed in a mechanical fashion to avoid redactional bias. Arabic orthography continued to develop into the second century, allowing qira'at, or variant oral readings of the rasm, to be documented in Quranic manuscripts.

Gerd R. Puin, a renowned Islamicist scholar at Saarland University, was the head of the Sanaa manuscript restoration project commissioned by the Yemeni government. His findings led Dr. Puin to assert that the Quran had undergone a "textual evolution" with textual variations, unconventional ordering of the chapters (surahs), rare styles of orthography, and may include stories that were written before Muhammed began his ministry and which have subsequently been rewritten. The Yemeni government subsequently denied him any further access to the manuscripts.

Non-Muslim people questioned the nature and modes of Muhammad's revelations. The Meccans interpreted the Quranic revelations based on their understanding of 'inspiration'. For them, poetry was closely connected to inspiration from a higher spiritual source. For this reason when Muhammad began preaching and reciting the Quran, the Meccans accused him of being a poet or a "poet possessed".

There are disagreements among scholars as to when the Quran was first compiled. A hadith in Sahih al-Bukhari states that the caliph Abu Bakr commanded Zayd ibn Thabit to compile the written Quran, relying upon both textual fragments and the memories of those who had memorized it. Some Shia Muslims believe that Ali ibn Abi Talib was the first to compile the Quran into one written text, a task completed shortly after the death of Muhammad.

Muhammad 

The Quran uses the term ummi to describe Muhammad. The majority of Muslim scholars interpret this word as a reference to an illiterate individual, though some modern scholars instead interpret it as a reference to those who belong to a community without a scripture.

According to the famous Sunni collector of traditions of Muhammad, Muhammad al-Bukhari (who lived about 250 years after Muhammad), Muhammad's wife Khadija bint Khuwaylid described that the first Quranic revelation occurred when the angel Gabriel visited Muhammad and asked him to recite. Muhammad responded ma ana bīqāre'u, which could be translated into a number of ways: 'I do not read' or 'what am I to read/recite?' or 'I will not read/recite'. Gabriel pressed him "until all the strength went out of me; thereupon he released me and said: 'Read!'" This was repeated three times and upon the third, Gabriel released him and said, "Read in the name of the Sustainer who created humankind from a clot! Read! And your Sustainer is the most Beautiful." After this Muhammad continued to have revelations sporadically over a period of twenty-three years, until shortly before his death in 11/632.

Muslims believe that Gabriel brought the word of God to Muhammad verbatim, and the Quran was divinely protected from any alteration or change. The Quran emphasizes that Muhammad was required only to receive the sacred text and that he had no authority to change it. It is also believed that God did not make himself known through the revelations; it was his will that was revealed.

According to tradition, Muhammad described the experience of revelation:

At times, it was also reported that the experience was painful for Muhammad. For example, he had been heard saying, "Never once did I receive a revelation without thinking that my soul had been torn away from me."

After Muhammad would receive revelations, he would later recite it to his Companions, who also memorized it or wrote it down. Before the Quran was commonly available in written form, speaking it from memory prevailed as the mode of teaching it to others. The practice of memorizing the whole Quran is still practised among Muslims. Millions of people have memorized the entire Quran in Arabic. This fact, taken in the context of 7th-century Arabia, was not an extraordinary feat. People of that time had a penchant for recited poetry and had developed their skills in memorization to a remarkable degree. Events and competitions that featured the recitation of elaborate poetry were of great interest.

In Pre-Islamic Arabia, the society during the time of Muhammad was predominantly oral, and for this reason he would recite the Quranic verses to his Companions for them to memorize. Therefore, it is unknown whether the Quran was ever written and collected during the time of Muhammad. While writing was not a common skill during Muhammad's time, Mecca, being a commercial center, had a number of people who could write. Some scholars believe that several scribes including Zayd ibn Thabit and Ubay ibn Ka'b recorded verses of the Quran. This provides an explanation as to how the Quran existed in written form during the life of Muhammad, even if it was not compiled into one text.

Muhammad's cousin, Ibn Abbas, describes the way in which the final version of the Quran was fixed: "the prophet recited the book before Gabriel every year in the month of Ramadan, and in the month in which he died he recited it before him twice." It is believed that toward the end of Muhammad's life a special act of revelation occurred in which a final and complete version of the Quran was created. The term 'recite', which is used here, is referring to the custom where a Quranic scholar recites the entire Quran from beginning to end a number of times before a senior scholar. According to this tradition the act of recital is being performed by Muhammad, with the angel Gabriel playing the role of superior authority.

In one of the hadith Muhammad is recorded as saying: "I leave among you two things of high estimation: the Book of God and my Family." Some scholars argue that this provides evidence that the Quran had been collected and written during this time because it is not correct to call something al-kitab (book) when it is merely in the [people's] memories. The word al-kitab signifies a single and united entity and does not apply to a text which is scattered and not collected. However, Alan Jones has explored the use of this word in the Quran, finding that there is no evidence that it was used in such a "concrete sense" in reference to the Quran and other scriptures, but instead evidence points to an "abstract meaning". He further considers the role of writing among Arabs in the early seventh century and accounts in the Sira of the dictation of parts of the Quran to scribes towards the end of the Medinan period.

Another argument some Shia and Sunni scholars bring up is the importance that Muhammad attached to the Quran. They believe that since Muhammad put so much importance to the Quran he had to have ordered the writing of it during his lifetime. For example, Zayd ibn Thabit reported, "We used to record the Quran from parchments in the presence of the Messenger of God."

Some authors believe that, as long as Muhammad was alive, there was always the expectation of further revelation as well as occasional abrogations. Any formal collection of the material already revealed could not properly be considered a complete text.

Abu Bakr's compilation 
According to Sunni scholars, during the life of Muhammad parts of the Quran, though written, were scattered among his companions, much of it as private possession. After the Battle of Yamama in 633, when 70 Muslims who had memorized the Quran were killed, steps began to be taken to collate the body of material. The death of Salim Mawla Abi Hudhayfa was most significant, as he was one of the very few who had been entrusted by Muhammad to teach the Quran. Consequently, upon Umar's insistence, Abu Bakr ordered the collection of the hitherto scattered pieces of the Quran into one copy, assigning Zayd ibn Thabit, Muhammad's main scribe, to gather the written fragments held by different members of the community. Ibn Thabit noted: 

Ibn Hajar al-Asqalani draws special attention to Zayd's statement, "I found two verses of Sura al-Bara'a with Abu Khuzaima al-Ansari," as demonstrating that Zayd's own writings and memorization were not deemed sufficient. Everything required verification. The compilation was kept by the Caliph Abu Bakr, after his death by his successor, Caliph Umar, who on his deathbed gave them to Hafsa bint Umar, his daughter and one of Muhammad's widows.

Uthman ibn Affan and the canonization

According to Islamic tradition, the process of canonization ended under the third caliph, Uthman ibn Affan (r. 23/644–35/655), about twenty years after the death of Muhammad in 650 CE, though date is not exact because it was not recorded by early Arab annalists.
The Qur'anic canon is the form of the Quran as recited and written in which it is religiously binding for the Muslim community. This canonical corpus is closed and fixed in the sense that nothing in the Quran can be changed or modified.

By the time of Uthman's caliphate, there was a perceived need for clarification of Qur'an reading. The Caliphate had grown considerably, expanding into Iraq, Syria, Egypt, and Iran, bringing into Islam's fold many new converts from various cultures with varying degrees of isolation.

It is believed that the general Hudhayfah ibn al-Yaman reported this problem to the caliph and asked him to establish a unified text. According to the history of al-Tabari, during the expedition there were 10,000 Kufan warriors, 6,000 in Azerbaijan and 4,000 at Rayy. A large number of soldiers disagreeing about the correct way of reciting the Quran may have caused Hudhayfah to promote a unified text. An example of the confusion at this time is seen during a campaign in Tabaristan, where one of the soldiers asked Hudhayfah, "How did the Messenger of God pray?" Hudhayfah told him the soldier prayed before fighting.

It is believed upon Hudhayfah's request Uthman obtained the sheets of the Quran from Ḥafṣa and appointed a commission consisting of Zayd and three prominent Meccans, and instructed them to copy the sheets into several volumes based on the dialect of Quraysh, the main tribe of Mecca.

When the task was finished Uthman kept one copy in Medina and sent others to Kufa, Baṣra, Damascus, and, according to some accounts, Mecca, and ordered that all other variant copies of the Quran be destroyed. This was done everywhere except in Kufa, where some scholars argue that Ibn Masʿūd and his followers refused.

The above quoted hadith refers to the manuscripts of the Quran compiled during the time of Caliph Abu Bakr, which were inherited by Caliph Umar's daughter Hafsa, a wife of Muhammad, and then returned to her, as promised. Sean Anthony and Catherine Bronson note that "Zuhrī—the earliest known scholar to emphasize the importance of Ḥafṣah’s codex for the collection of the caliph ʿUthmān’s recension—also serves as the authority for the accounts of the destruction of Ḥafṣah’s scrolls (ṣuḥuf)." After her death, he reported that Hafsa's brother inherited the manuscripts and allowed Uthman or according to some versions, Abd al-Malik ibn Marwan to destroy them.

It is generally accepted that the Uthmanic text comprises all 114 suras in the order known today.

Beliefs of some Shia Muslim scholars about the origins of the Quran may differ in some respects from Sunni beliefs. According to influential Marja' Abu al-Qasim al-Khoei, Uthman's collection of the Quran was metaphorical, not physical. He did not collect the verses and suras in one volume, but in the sense that he united the Muslims on the reading of one authoritative recension. al-Khoei also argues that the one reading on which Uthman united the Muslims was the one in circulation among most Muslims, and that it reached them through uninterrupted transmission from Muhammad.

This is one of the most contested issues and an area where many non-Muslim and Muslim scholars often clash.

Ali ibn Abi Talib 

Some Shia scholars believe that Ali ibn Abi Talib possessed a personal apograph of the Quran, which he collected six months after Muhammad's death, and that this was the first compilation of the Quran. The unique aspect about this version is that it was collected in the order it was sent, which mainstream Shi'ites hold is the only difference between the Quran as known today and Ali's.

A few Shia scholars argue that Ali presented his Quran to the community, but they refused to acknowledge his copy. One report states, "he had brought the complete Book [of God], comprising the interpretation and the revelation, the precise and ambiguous verses, the abrogating and the abrogated verses; nothing was missing from it, [not even] a letter alif, nor lam. But they did not accept it from him" They also believe that Ali's version of the Quran contained verses that are not seen in the Uthmanic codex we have today. They believe changes in the order of verses and suras did take place and that there were variant readings, tabdil, exchange of words such as umma to imma, rearrangement of words and deletion of words pertaining to the right of Ali being the first caliph.

The contemporary Shia scholar Abu al-Qasim al-Khoei provides a counter argument to this belief. He states that even if Ali's Quran incorporated additions that are not part of the existing Quran, this does not mean that these additions comprised parts of the Quran and have been dropped from it due to alteration. Rather, these additions were interpretations or explanations of what God was saying, or were in the form of revelations from God, explaining the intention of the verses in the Quran. These additions are not part of the standard Quran and not considered part of what the Muslim Messenger of God was commanded to convey to his community.

View of non-Muslim scholarship
The origin of the Quran has been a subject of sustained academic research. There have also been a number of proposals for refinement of the traditional view and even its fundamental re-evaluation.

Until around the 1970s, non-Muslim scholars—while not accepting the divinity of the Quran—did accept its Islamic origin story. Ernest Renan famously declared that "Islam was born, not amid the mystery which cradles the origins of other religions, but rather in the full light of history"—an empire ruling in the name of the religion of Islam and whose expansion was fuelled by religious fervor, and which presided over the compilation, editing, approving and distributing of the holy book of that religion (the Quran).

But in the 1970s revisionist historians began to question Islamic "literary sources" — tafsir or commentaries on the Quran, hadith, or accounts of what the Islamic prophet Muhammad approved of or didn't, and sira, biography of the prophet — upon which the traditional account of the Quran were based. They employed a "source-critical" approach to this literature, including as evidence relevant archaeology, epigraphy, numismatics, and contemporary non-Arabic literature, that they argued provided "hard facts" and an ability to crosscheck.

By 2008, Fred Donner was summarizing the state of the field in the following terms:

In 1999, Cook and Crone argued that "there is no hard evidence for the existence of the Koran in any form before the last decade of the seventh century." Partial Quranic manuscripts such as the Sanaa manuscript and the Birmingham Quran manuscript, which have been carbon-dated back to the early seventh century, were discovered later. However, Marijn van Putten, who has published work on idiosyncratic orthography common to all early manuscripts of the Uthmanic text type has stated and claims to have demonstrated with examples that due to a number of these same idiosyncratic spellings present in the Birmingham fragment (Mingana 1572a + Arabe 328c), it is "clearly a descendant of the Uthmanic text type" and that it is "impossible" that it is a pre-Uthmanic copy, despite its early radiocarbon dating.

Author, journalist and scholar Toby Lester notes the Quran "assumes a familiarity with language, stories, and events that seem to have been lost even to the earliest of Muslim exegetes". Cook and Christopher Rose note the Quran contains obscure words and phrases, "mystery letters," or Muqattaʿat—groups of between one and four letters that do not form words and begin about one quarter of surahs of the Quran, and the Sabians religious group unknown to historians. Cook argue that "someone must once have known" what these mean, and that their meaning was forgotten now suggests the Quran may have been "off the scene for several decades".

There is no mention of the "Quran" nor "Islam", nor "rightly guided caliphs", nor any of the famous futūḥ battles by Christian Byzantines in their historical records describing the Arab invaders advance, leaders or religion; the lack of any surviving documents by those Arabs who "lived through the establishment of the Caliphate"; the fact that coins of the region and era did not use Islamic iconography until sometime after 685 CE.

According to tradition, the Quran was composed in the early 7th century CE, but according to historian Tom Holland, "only in the 690's did a Caliph finally get around to inscribing the Prophet's name on a public monument; only decades after that did the first tentative references to him start to appear in private inscriptions". The historian Stephen Shoemaker holds that the Quran did not reach its final compilation until the reign of Abd al-Malik (685-705 CE).

Regarding the collection and editing of the Quran into a book (Mus'haf), historian Michael Cook writes that while there is "more or less" common ground among hadith, aka traditions that Muhammad did not do it but that this task was completed by the end of the reign of Caliph Uthman. Otherwise hadith do not agree:
We learn that some of Muhammad's followers already knew the whole Quran by heart in his lifetime -- yet subsequently it had to [be] pieced together out of fragments collected from here and there. We are told that Muhammad regularly dictated his revelations to a scribe -- yet the scripture was later in danger of being lost through the death in battle of those who had it by heart. It was collected and made into a book by the first Caliph; or by the second; or by the third, Uthman. Alternatively, it had already been collected before the time of Uthman, and he merely had the text standarised and other versions destroyed. The last of these traditions has tended to prevail, but the choice is a somewhat arbitrary one... 

The accounts of non-Muslim conquered peoples also conflict with the accounts of traditional Islamic literature. Examining 7th century Byzantine Christian sources commentary on the Arab "immigrants" (Mhaggraye) who were invading and settling in formerly Byzantine territory at that time, historian Abdul-Massih Saadi found the Christians never mentioned the terms "Quran" nor "Islam" nor that the immigrants were of a new religion. They referred to the immigrants in ethnic terms -- "among them (Arabs) there are many Christians...". The Christians used secular or political, not religious terms (kings, princes, rulers) to refer to the Arab leaders. Muhammad was "the first king of the Mhaggraye", also guide, teacher, leader or great ruler. They did however mention the religion of the Arabs. The immigrants' religion was described as monotheist "in accordance with the Old Law (Old Testament)". When the Emir of the immigrants and Patriarch of the local Christians did have a religious colloquium there was much discussion of the scriptures but no mention of the Quran, "a possible indication that the Quran was not yet in circulation." The Christians reported the Emir was accompanied by "learned Jews", that the immigrants "accepted the Torah just as the Jews and Samaritans", though none of the sources described the immigrants as Jews.

Wansbrough's students Crone and Cook co-authored a book called Hagarism: The Making of the Islamic World (1977). Neither Crone nor Cook today, however, hold all of the views presented in their work. Crone has since stated that it is "difficult to doubt" that Muhammad uttered "all or most" of the Qur'an. She says this can be said with "reasonable assurance".

Support for the traditional Islamic narrative
Not all scholars question the sacred history of the Quran. Emran El-Badawi writes, "the opening chapters of Fred Donner's Narratives of Islamic Origins: The Beginnings of Islamic Historical Writing claims to refute the theoretical and methodological flaws of the skeptical school and instead dates the composition of the Quran, as a closed canon, to an Arabian context of early believers preceding ... the first civil war in 656."

The datings in 2015 of the Birmingham Quran manuscript lead Joseph E. B. Lumbard, a convert to Islam and associate professor of Quranic studies at the College of Islamic Studies at Hamad Bin Khalifa University in Qatar, to comment:

These recent empirical findings are of fundamental importance. They establish that as regards the broad outlines of the history of the compilation and codification of the Quranic text, the classical Islamic sources are far more reliable than had hitherto been assumed. Such findings thus render the vast majority of Western revisionist theories regarding the historical origins of the Quran untenable.

However, on Birmingham manuscript, David Thomas pointed out that the radiocarbon testing found the death date of the animal whose skin made up the Quran, not the date when the Quran was written. Since blank parchment was often stored for years after being produced, he said the Quran could have been written as late as 650–655, during the Quranic codification under Uthman. And later, Marijn van Putten, who has published work on idiosyncratic orthography common to all early manuscripts of the Uthmanic text, stated that it can not be a pre-Uthmanic copy, despite its early radiocarbon dating.

In dating of the text, the Dome of the Rock inscriptions, which have been known for over a century, are significant. The inner face of the octagon include the declaration of faith and verses describing the powers of God. Next Muhammad is introduced, with a blessing that, though uncited in the Quran, was already in use in 694. Then Christians are preached about the prophet-hood and mortality of Jesus, followed by the claim that God is sufficient unto Himself. At the end, people are commanded to bend to His will and punishment is threatened otherwise.

The absence of contemporaneous corroborating material from the very first century of Islam has raised numerous questions as to the authenticity of the account provided by later traditionalist sources. All that is preserved from this time period are a few commemorative building inscriptions and assorted coins. However, some scholars deny such a belittlement of key sources from the era. Besides the Dome of the Rock inscriptions mentioned above, there are also brief Quranic passages on coins issued from the time of Abd al-Malik ibn Marwan (697-750). These passages include the shahadah, verses 112:1-3 or -4 complete except for the initial basmallah and the introductory word "say", and part of 9:33, but with some variations: "He sent him with the guidance and the Religion of Truth, that He may cause it to prevail over all religion..." Similar to the contemporary inscriptions at the Dome of the Rock these portions are clearly intended to declare the primacy of the new religion of Islam over Christianity, in particular.

Skeptical scholars, nonetheless, point out that the earliest account of Muhammad's life by Ibn Ishaq was written about a century after Muhammad died and all later narratives by Islamic biographers contain far more details and embellishments about events which are entirely lacking in Ibn Ishaq's text.

In a 2008 online article titled "What do we actually know about Mohammed?", Patricia Crone casts doubt onto skeptical theories of the origins of the Qur'an. 

Fred Donner has argued for an early date for the collection of the Quran, based on his reading of the text itself. He points out that if the Quran had been collected over the tumultuous early centuries of Islam, with their vast conquests and expansion and bloody incidents between rivals for the caliphate, there would have been some evidence of this history in the text. However, there is nothing in the Quran that does not reflect what is known of the earliest Muslim community.

In 1972, during the restoration of the Great Mosque of San'a in Yemen, labourers stumbled upon a "paper grave" containing tens of thousands of fragments of parchment on which verses of the Quran were written. Some of these fragments were believed to be the oldest Quranic texts yet found.

The latest in origin of the Quran is the discovery of parchments of Quranic text by the University of Birmingham in 2015, the parchment material has been radiocarbon dated to the period between 568 and 645 with 95.4% accuracy. The test was carried out in a laboratory at the University of Oxford. The result places the parchment close to the time of Muhammad, who is generally thought to have lived between 570 and 632. Researchers conclude that the parchment is among the earliest written textual evidence of the Quran in existence. François Déroche of the Collège de France, however, expressed reservations about the reliability of the radiocarbon dates proposed for the Birmingham leaves, noting instances elsewhere in which radiocarbon dating had proved inaccurate in testing Qurans with an explicit endowment date. Mustafa Shah, Senior Lecturer in Islamic Studies at the School of Oriental and African Studies, has suggested that the grammatical marks and verse separators in the Birmingham leaves are inconsistent with the proposed early radiocarbon dates.

Textual criticism

In the 1970s, what has been described as a "wave of sceptical scholars" challenged a great deal of the received wisdom in Islamic studies. They argued that the Islamic historical tradition had been greatly corrupted in transmission. They tried to correct or reconstruct the early history of Islam from other, presumably more reliable, sources such as coins, inscriptions, and non-Islamic sources. The oldest of this group was John Wansbrough (1928–2002). Wansbrough's works were widely noted, but perhaps not widely read. In 1972 a cache of ancient Qur'ans in a mosque in Sana'a, Yemen was discovered – commonly known as the Sana'a manuscripts. The German scholar Gerd R. Puin and his research team, who investigated these Quran fragments for many years, made approximately 35,000 microfilm photographs of the manuscripts, which he dated to early part of the 8th century. Puin has not published the entirety of his work, but noted unconventional verse orderings, minor textual variations, and rare styles of orthography. He also suggested that some of the parchments were palimpsests which had been reused. Puin believed that this implied an evolving text as opposed to a fixed one. Keith Small, in Textual Criticism and Qur’ān Manuscripts, has concluded that it is not possible to develop a reliable critical text of the Quran based on the sources currently available. The Corpus Coranicum project is an ongoing effort to develop a critical edition of the Quran.

Differences and similarities with the Bible

Skeptical scholars account for the many similarities between the Quran and the Jewish and Hebrew Scriptures by saying that Muhammad was teaching what he believed to be a universal history, as he had heard it from the Jews and Christians he had encountered in Arabia and on his travels – as well as his exposure to the Hanif tradition by way of his paternal-grandfather, Abdul Muttalib. These scholars also disagree with the Islamic belief that the whole of the Quran is addressed by God to humankind. They note that there are numerous passages where God is directly addressed, or mentioned in the third person, or where the narrator swears by various entities, including God. The Quranic account, however, differs significantly regarding the crucifixion and death of Jesus.

Similarities with Apocryphal legends

Aside from the Bible, Quran relies on several Apocryphal sources, like the Protoevangelium of James, Gospel of Pseudo-Matthew, and several infancy gospels. Several narratives rely on Jewish Midrash Tanhuma legends, like the narrative of Cain learning to bury the body of Abel in Surah 5:31.

Varying codices and the start of the canonization
Before Uthman established the canon of the Quran, there may have been different versions or codices in complete state, though none has yet been discovered. Such codices as may exist never gained general approval and were viewed by Muslims as individuals' personal copies. With respect to partial codices, there is opinion that "the search for variants in the partial versions extant before the Caliph Uthman's alleged recension in the 640s has not yielded any differences of great significance". The two most influential codices at this time are ʿAbdullah ibn Masʿud's and Ubayy ibn Kaʿb's. Al-Qurazi recounted seeing the mushafs used by Ibn Mas'ud, Ubayy, and Zaid b. Thabit and finding no differences between them.

ʿAbdullah ibn Masʿud's codex
The most influential of the allegedly varying codices was that of ʿAbdullah ibn Masʿud, an early convert who became a personal servant to Muhammad. It is reported that he learned around seventy suras directly from Muhammad, who appointed him as one of the first teachers of Quranic recitation. Later he was appointed to an administrative post in Kufa by the caliph ʿUmar, where he became a leading authority on the Quran and Sunnah. Some sources suggest that Ibn Masʿud refused to destroy his copy of the Quran or to stop teaching it when the ʿUthmanic codex was made official.

There are two points on which Ibn Masʿud's version is alleged to differ from the ʿUthmanic text: the order of the suras and some variants in the readings. Muhammad Mustafa Al-A'zami lists three reports concerning the omission of three suras, (Al-Fatiha and Al-Mu'awwidhatayn, the two short suras with which the Quran ends (Suras 113 and 114)), he then states that "early scholars such as al-Nawawi and Ibn Hazm denounced these reports as lies fathered upon Ibn Mas'ud." Most of the other differences involve only altered vowels with the same consonantal text, which caused variations in recitation. Dr. Ramon Harvey notes that Ibn Masʿūd's reading continued in use, and was even taught as the dominant reading in Kufa for at least a century after his death, in a paper discussing how some of his distinctive readings continued to play a role in Hanafi fiqh.

Ubay ibn Ka'b's codex
The second most influential codex was that of Ubay ibn Ka'b, a Medinan Muslim who served as a secretary for Muhammad. It is believed that he may have been more prominent as a Quranic specialist than Ibn Masʿud during Muḥammad's lifetime. There are reports that he was responsible for memorizing certain important revelations on legal matters, which from time to time Muhammad asked him to recite. In a few hadiths, Ubay is seen in a variety of roles. For instance, the "sheets" of Ubay are sometimes mentioned in some instances instead of those of Ḥafsa, and sometimes he is also mentioned in some hadiths instead of Zayd, dictating the Quran to scribes.

His version of the Quran is said to have included two short suras not in the Uthmanic or Ibn Masʿud texts: Sūrat al-Khal, with three verses, and Sūrat al-Ḥafd, with six. Professor Sean Anthony has discussed the textual history of these two surahs in detail and noted that their presence in mushafs modelled after Ubayy's (and to a lesser extent, certain other companions) is "robustly represented in our earliest and best sources". While we lack material evidence in the form of manuscripts, he notes that many of the Muslim sources make direct material observations of the surahs in such mushafs. The order of suras in Ubayy's codex is said to have differed from that of Uthman's and Ibn Masʿud's as well, although these are structural differences rather than textual variations. The surah order of the lower text of the early seventh century Ṣanʽā’ 1 palimpsest is known to have similarities with that reported of Ubayy (and to a lesser extent, that of Ibn Mas'ud).

The first sura, entitled al-Khal ("separation"), is translated as: "O Allah, we seek your help and ask your forgiveness, and we praise you and we do not disbelieve in you. We separate from and leave him who sins against you."

The second sura, entitled al-Hafd ("haste"), is translated as: "O Allah, we worship You and to You we pray and prostrate and to You we run and hasten to serve You. We hope for Your mercy and we fear Your punishment. Your punishment will certainly reach the disbelievers." These two pieces are said to constitute qunut (that is, supplications which Muhammad sometimes made in morning prayer or in witr prayer after recitation of suras from the Quran). They are in fact identical to some parts of qunut reported in the collections of hadiths. (See Nawawi, al-adhkar, Cairo, 1955, pp. 57–58.)

The single additional so-called aya is translated: "If the son of Adam were given a valley full of riches, he would wish a second one; and if he were given two valleys full of riches, he would surely ask for a third. Nothing will fill the belly of the son of Adam except dust, and Allah is forgiving to him who is repentant." This text is known to be a hadith from Muhammad. (Bukhari, VIII, No. 444-47.) According to Ibn 'Abbas (No. 445) and 'Ubay (No. 446) this text was at times thought to be part of the Quran. However, Ubay himself clarifies that after sura 102: "I had been revealed, [the sahaba] did not consider the above to be part of the Quran." (Bukhari, VIII, No. 446.)

This explanation of Ubay also makes it very clear that the companions of Mohammad did not differ at all about what was part of the Quran and what was not part of the Quran when the revelation had ceased. It is also important to note that the hadith appeared in the mushaf of Ubay because it was for his own personal use; that is, in his private notebook, where he did not always distinguish between Quranic material and hadith, since the notebook was not meant for public use and he himself knew well what to make of his own notes. All companions of Mohammad are said to have had their own copies of the Quran, with notes, for personal use.

The Islamic reports of these copies of the Quran of the companions of Mohammad only tell of various differences according to reports that reached them (e.g., the hadith in Bukhari, VIII, No. 446, that Ubay at some early stage held this sentence to be part of the Quran). However, the tangible manuscripts of these copies of the Quran have not survived but were destroyed, having been considered obsolete.

Early manuscripts to the final canonical text

After Uthman had the other codices destroyed there were still variations in the reading and the text of this Quran. However, scholars deny the possibility of great changes of the text arguing that addition, suppression or alteration would have led to controversy 'of which there is little trace'. They further state that even though Uthman became unpopular among Muslims, he was not charged with alteration or mutilation of the Quran in general.

During the manuscript age, the Quran was the most copied Arabic text. It was believed that copying the Quran would bring blessings on the scribe and the owner.

The Arabic script as we know it today was unknown in Muhammad's time (as Arabic writing styles have progressed through time) and the Quran was preserved through memorization and written references on different materials. As Arab society started to evolve into using writing more regularly, writing skills evolved accordingly. Early Quranic Arabic was written in a rasm which lacked precision because distinguishing between consonants was impossible due to the absence of diacritical marks (a'jam). Vowelling marks (tashkil) to indicate prolongation or vowels were absent as well. Due to this there were endless possibilities for the mispronunciation of the word. The Arabic script as we know it today, the scripta plena, which has pointed texts and is fully vowelled was not perfected until the middle of the 9th century.

Umayyad Period (44/661–132/750) – Hijazi script

The earliest known manuscripts of the Quran are collectively called the Hijazi script, and are mostly associated with the Umayyad period.

Most of the fundamental reform to the manuscripts of the Quran took place under Abd al-Malik, the fifth Umayyad caliph (65/685–86/705). Under Abd al-Malik's reign, Abu'l Aswad al-Du'ali (died 688) founded the Arabic grammar and invented the system of placing large coloured dots to indicate the tashkil. The Umayyad governor al-Hajjaj ibn Yusuf al-Thaqafi later enforced this system.

During this time the construction of the Dome of the Rock in Jerusalem in 72/691–92 was done, which was complete with Quranic inscriptions. The inscriptions on the Dome of the Rock in fact represent the earliest known dated passages from the Quran. In these inscriptions, many letters are already provided with diacritical points.

The earliest codices of the Quran found in the Umayyad period were most likely made in single volumes, which can be determined from the large fragments that have survived. Also during this time, the format of the codex went from being vertical to horizontal in the 8th century. It is believed this change to horizontal formats and thick/heavy-looking scripts may have been done to show the superiority of the Quran and to distinguish the Islamic tradition from the Jewish and Christian ones, who used vertical formats for their scriptures.

During this time, there was a diversity of styles in which the Quran was written. One characteristic seen in most of these manuscripts is the elongated shafts of the free-standing alif and the right-sided tail (foot) of the isolated alif. Also, these manuscripts do not have headings of chapters (suras). Instead, a blank space is left at the end of one sura and at the beginning of another.

Abbasid Period (132/750–640/1258)

Early Abbasid Style

Unlike the manuscripts from the Umayyad Dynasty, many of the early Abbasid manuscripts were copied in a number of volumes. This is evident from the large scripts used and the smaller number of lines per page. Early Quranic manuscripts provide evidence for the history of the Quranic text and their formal features tell us something about the way art and its deeper meaning were perceived in the classical age of Islam. Both its script and layout turned out to be constructed according to elaborate geometrical and proportional rules.

The main characteristic of these scripts was their writing style. The letters in most of these manuscripts are heavy-looking, relatively short and horizontally elongated. The slanted isolated form of the alif that was present in the Umayyad period completely disappeared and was replaced by a straight shaft with a pronounced right-sided foot, set at a considerable distance from the following letter. Also, unlike the Hijazi scripts, these are often richly illuminated in gold and other colours. Another difference is that sura headings are clearly marked and enclosed in rectangular panels with marginal vignettes or palmettes protruding into the outer margins. These Qurans of the early Abbasid period were also bound in wooden boards, structured like a box enclosed on all sides with a movable upper cover that was fastened to the rest of the structure with leather thongs.

New Abbasid Style
The New Abbasid Style (NS) began at the end of the 9th century C.E. and was used for copying the Quran until the 12th centuries, and maybe even as late as the 13th century. Unlike manuscripts copied in Early Abbasid scripts, NS manuscripts had vertical formats.

During this time, Al-Khalil ibn Ahmad al-Farahidi (died 786) devised a tashkil system to replace that of Abu al-Aswad. His system has been universally used since the early 11th century, and includes six diacritical marks: fatha (a), damma (u), kasra (i), sukun (vowel-less), shadda (double consonant), madda (vowel prolongation; applied to the alif).

Another central figure during this time was Abu Bakr b. Mujāhid (died 324/936). His goal was to restrict the number of reliable readings and accept only those based on a fairly uniform consonantal text. He chose seven well-known Quran teachers of the 2nd/8th century and declared that their readings all had divine authority, which the others lacked. He based this on the popular ḥadith in which Muhammad says the Quran was revealed to him in "seven aḥruf". During this time there was strong Quranic traditions in Kufa, Baṣra, Medina, Damascus, and Mecca. Due to this, Ibn Mujāhid selected one reading each for Medina, Mecca, Baṣra, and Damascus—those of Nafi‘ (died 169/785), Ibn Kathir (died 120/737), Abu ʿAmr (died 154/770), and IbnʿAmir (died 118/736), respectively—and three for Kūfa, those of ʿAsim (died 127/744), Ḥamza (died 156/772), and al-Kisaʾi (died 189/804). His attempt to limit the number of canonical readings to seven was not acceptable to all, and there was strong support for alternative readings in most of the five cities. In the present day the most common reading that is in general use is that of 'Aasim al-Kufi through Hafs.

The 11th-century eastern Quranic manuscript contains the 20th juz' (section) of a Quran that originally consisted of 30 parts. The arrangement into 30 parts corresponds to the number of days in the month of Ramadan, during which the Muslim is obliged to fast and to read through the whole of the Quran. Other sections or fragments of this magnificent manuscript lie scattered in various collections all over the world. A Turkish note ascribes the Quran to the hand of the Caliph Ali, Muhammad's cousin and son-in-law, and thus demonstrates the high significance of this manuscript. The text is written in Eastern Kufic, a monumental script that was developed in Iran in the late 10th century. The writing and the illumination of the manuscript bear witness to the great artistic skills of the calligrapher and the illustrator. The manuscript is at the Bavarian State Library in Munich, Germany. Out of seven complete or nearly complete semi-Kufic Qurans from before the end of the eleventh century, four contain a verse count. Although a small sample, it does suggest that the use of a verse count was a prevalent and quite deeply rooted practice in semi-Kufic Qurans between ca. 950 and ca. 1100.

Abu Ali Muhammad ibn Muqla (died 940), an accomplished calligrapher from Baghdad, was also a prominent figure at this time. He became vizir to three Abbasid caliphs and is credited with developing the first script to obey strict proportional rules. Ibn Muqla's system was used in the development and standardization of the Quranic script, and his calligraphic work became the standard way of writing the Quran. However it was later perfected by Ibn al-Bawwab (d. 1022), the master calligrapher who continued Muqla's tradition. Muqla's system became one of the most popular styles for transcribing Arabic manuscripts in general, being favoured for its legibility. The eleventh century Quran is one of the earliest dated manuscripts in this style.

This "new style" is defined by breaks and angular forms and by extreme contrasts between the thick and thin strokes. The script was initially used in administrative and legal documents, but then it replaced earlier Quranic scripts. It is possible that it was easier to read than the early 'Abbasid scripts, which differ greatly from current writing. Economic factors may also have played a part because while the "new style" was being introduced, paper was also beginning to spread throughout the Muslim world, and the decrease in the price of books triggered by the introduction of this new material seems to have led to an increase in its demand. The "new style" was the last script to spread throughout the Muslim world before the introduction of printing. It remained in use until the 13th century, at which point it was restricted to titles only.

1924 Cairo edition
The influential standard Quran of Cairo ("1342 Cairo text" using the Islamic calendar) is the Quran that was used throughout almost all the Muslim world until the Saudi Quran of 1985. The Egyptian edition is based on the "Ḥafṣ" version ("qira'at") based on ʻAsim's recitation, the 8th-century recitation of Kufa. ۞ It uses a set of additional symbols and an elaborate system of modified vowel-signs and for minute details, not identical to any older system.  The Cairo edition has become the standard for modern printings of the Quran with the exception of those used in all North Africa (excluding Egypt) where the Warsh version is used.

A committee of leading professors from Al-Azhar University had started work on the project in 1907 but it was not until 10 July 1924 that the "Cairo Qur’an" was first published by Amiri Press under the patronage of Fuad I of Egypt, as such, it is sometimes known as the "royal (amīriyya) edition." The goal of the government of the newly formed Kingdom of Egypt was not to delegitimize the other qir’at, but to eliminate that, which the colophon labels as errors, found in Qur’anic texts used in state schools. To do this they chose to preserve one of the fourteen Qira'at “readings”, namely that of Hafs (d. 180/796), student of ‘Asim. Its publication has been called a "terrific success", and the edition has been described as one "now widely seen as the official text of the Qur’an", so popular among both Sunni and Shi'a that the common belief among less well-informed Muslims is "that the Qur’an has a single, unambiguous reading", i.e. that of the 1924 Cairo version. Minor amendments were made later in 1924 and in 1936 - the "Faruq edition" in honour of then ruler, King Faruq.

Reasons given for the overwhelming popularity of Hafs and Asim range from the fact that it is easy to recite, to the simple statement that "God has chosen it". Ingrid Mattson credits mass-produced printing press mushafs with increasing the availability of the written Quran but also diminishing the diversity of qira'at. Written text has become canonical and oral recitation has lost much of its previous equality.

Muslim disagreement over whether to include the Basmala within the Quranic text, reached consensus following the 1924 Edition, which included it as the first verse (āyah) of Quran chapter 1 but otherwise included it as an unnumbered line of text preceding the other 113 chapters. The Cairo Quran adopted the Kufan tradition of separating and numbering verses, and thus standardized a different verse numbering to Flügel's 1834 edition. It adopted the chronological order of chapters attributed to Ibn Abbās, which became widely accepted following 1924. A large number of pre-1924 Qurans were destroyed by dumping them in the river Nile.

Prominent committee members included Islamic scholar, Muhammad b. ‘Ali al-Husayni al-Haddad, Egypt's senior Qur'an Reader (Shaykh al-Maqâri). Noteworthy Western scholars/academics working in Egypt during the era include Bergsträsser and Jeffery. Methodological differences aside, speculation alludes to a spirit of cooperation. Bergsträsser was certainly impressed with the work.

Completeness

Islamic sources
According to Islamic sources before Caliph Uthman's standardization, after which variants were burned, the Quran may have contained either 116 chapters (Ubayy Ibn Ka'ab's codex) or 111 chapters (Ibn Ma'sud's codex).

Islamic view: Sunni and Shia
Most Muslims believe that Quran, as it is presented today, is complete and untouched, supported by their faith in Quranic verses such as "We [Allah] have, without doubt, sent down the Reminder [the Quran]; and We will assuredly guard it [from corruption]".

However, some Sunni literature contains reports that suggest that some of the revelations had already been lost before the collection of the Quran initiated by Abu Bakr. In one report, 'Umar was once looking for the text of a specific verse of the Quran on stoning as a punishment for adultery, which he remembered. Later, he discovered that the only person who had any record of that verse had been killed in the battle of Yamama and as a result the verse was lost. Some of the Companions recalled that same verse, one person being 'A'isha, Muhammad's youngest wife. She is believed to have said that a sheet on which two verses, including the one on stoning, were under her bedding and that after Muhammad died, a domestic animal got into the room and ate the sheet. Experts on hadith literature have rejected this hadith, as all routes of transmission either contain narrators charged with dishonesty in disclosing sources or simply conflict with the majority version of the report, which all have authentic routes of transmission but omit the part about the piece of paper being eaten.

Certain Shia scholars state that Ali's predecessors wilfully excluded all references to the right of Ali to be the caliph after Muhammad died. Some Shias questioned the integrity of the Uthmanic codex, stating that two surahs, "al-Nurayn" (The Two Lights) and "al-Walayah" (the Guardianship), which dealt with the virtues of Muhammad's family, were removed.

Al-Khoei addresses this issue and argues for the authenticity and completeness of the Quran on the basis that it was compiled during the lifetime of Muhammad. His argument is based on hadiths and on critically analysing the situation during and after the life of Muhammad. He states that the collection of the Quran by Abu Bakr, Umar, and Uthman occurred significantly after the caliphate was decided, and so if Ali's rule had been mentioned, there would have been no need for the Muslims to gather to appoint someone. The fact that none of the Companions mentioned this supposed alteration, either at the beginning of the caliphate or after Ali became caliph, is regarded as proof that this alteration did not occur.

Al-Khoei also argues that by the time 'Uthman became caliph, Islam had spread to such an extent that it was impossible for anyone to remove anything from the Quran. Uthman could have altered the text but he would have been unable to convince all those who had memorized the Quran to go along with his alterations. Any such alteration also would have been mentioned by Uthman's political opponents and assassins yet none accused him of this. Finally, he argues that if Uthman had altered the Quran, Ali would have restored it to its original state upon the death of Uthman, especially if verses of his rule had been removed. Instead Ali is seen promoting the Quran during his reign, which is evidence that there was no alteration.

Manuscripts
In the 20th century, the Sanaa manuscript was discovered. It has been radiocarbon dated to the range 578-669 CE with 95% confidence. The manuscript is a palimpsest with quranic verses in both upper and lower texts. The upper text has exactly the same verses and the same order of suras and verses as the standard Quran. The order of the suras in the lower text of the Sana'a codex is different from the order in the standard Quran. In addition, the lower text exhibits extensive variations from the counterpart text in the standard Quran; such that the lower text represents the only surviving early quranic manuscript that does not conform to the 'Uthmanic tradition. The majority of these variations add words and phrases, so as to emphasize or clarify the standard quranic reading. Some scholars have proposed parallels for these variations in reports of variants in 'companion codices' that were kept by individual companions to the Prophet outside of the mainstream tradition of 'Uthman; but these correspondences are much the minority. François Déroche proposes, on palaeographic grounds, a date for the lower text in the second half of the first century AH (hence 672 - 722 CE) and summarises the character of the Sana'a Palimpsest, "The scriptio inferior of the Codex Ṣanʿāʾ I has been transcribed in a milieu which adhered to a text of the Qurʾan different from the ʿUthmanic tradition as well as from the Qurʾanic codices of Ibn Masʿūd and Ubayy".

See also
 Corpus Coranicum
 Early Quranic manuscripts
 Biblical and Quranic narratives
 Prophets and messengers in Islam
 Quranic timeline
 Qisas Al-Anbiya
 Criticism of the Quran

Notes

References

Citations

Bibliography

Further reading

External links
History of preservation of Quranic manuscript
Read Quran Online
Dated Muslim Texts From 1-72 AH / 622-691 AD: Documentary Evidence For Early Islam Islamic Awareness
Corpus Coranicum: comprehensive website on early Quran manuscripts by the Berlin-Brandenburg Academy of Sciences and Humanities
Several early Qur'ans: information, zoomable images British Library website
History of the Quran

Quran
Quran
Literary criticism
Quran